The Basketball Federation of North Macedonia (Macedonian: Кошаркарска федерација на Северна Македонија / Košarkarska federacija na Severna Makedonija) is the governing body of basketball in North Macedonia. It was founded in 1948. The federation joined FIBA in 1993.  It organizes the Macedonian premier league and runs the North Macedonia national basketball team.

Domestic competitions

Men 
 Macedonian First League
 Macedonian Second League
 Macedonian Third League

Women 
 Macedonian Women's First League

International competitions

Senior teams 
 Men's national team
 Women's national team

Youth teams

U 20 

 North Macedonia national under-20 basketball team
 North Macedonia women's national under-20 basketball team

U 18 

 North Macedonia national under-18 basketball team
 North Macedonia women's national under-18 basketball team

U 16 

 North Macedonia national under-16 basketball team
 North Macedonia women's national under-16 basketball team

U 14 

 North Macedonia national under-14 basketball team
 North Macedonia women's national under-14 basketball team

See also
 North Macedonia national basketball team

External links
 Basketball Federation of North Macedonia 

 North Macedonia at FIBA Europe 

North Macedonia
Basketball in North Macedonia
Basketball
Sports organizations established in 1992